Economidichthys trichonis, the Trichonis dwarf goby, is a species of goby endemic to Lake Trichonis, an oligotrophic lake in western Greece, where it can be found at depths down to  in vegetated areas.  Males of this species can reach a length of  TL while females grow to  TL.  This species is the smallest freshwater fish in Europe with a mature female measuring only  SL.

References

Freshwater fish of Europe
Economidichthys
Endemic fauna of Greece
Fish described in 1990
Taxonomy articles created by Polbot